King Hui of Yan (died 272 BC), ancestral name Jī, clan name Yān, personal name unknown, was the fifth king of the state of Yan in Warring States period of Chinese history. He ruled the kingdom between 278 BC until his death in 272 BC.

King Hui was a son of King Zhao, he was appointed the heir apparent to the throne. He had been at odds with the general Yue Yi. After his succession, he replaced Yue Yi with Qi Jie as highest commander of the army. Yue Yi escaped to Zhao, where he was enfeoffed as Lord of Wangzhu. Yet Qi Jie was not a good leader, Yan was defeated by the troops of Qi under Tian Dan, lost all the territory of Qi again.  King Hui sent a letter to Yue Yi, accusing him of betraying the country. Yue Yi replied: "I have heard that the worthy and sage-like among the lords would never lay waste to the achievements they had established and thus were written about in the annals of their country, and that prescient scholars would never ruin the reputation they had perfected and thus were extolled by later generations." King Hui was regretful; as a compensation, he ordered Yue Jian, whom was Yue Yi's son, to inherit the title Lord of Changguo.

In 272 BC, King Hui was murdered by his chancellor Lord Cheng'an. He was succeeded by King Wucheng.

References

Monarchs of Yan (state)
272 BC deaths
Chinese kings
Year of birth unknown
3rd-century BC Chinese monarchs